The bicolored antvireo (Dysithamnus occidentalis) is an insectivorous bird in the antbird family Thamnophilidae. It is found on the west slope of the Andes from southwest Colombia to northwest Ecuador. Its natural habitat is subtropical or tropical moist montane forests. It is threatened by habitat loss.

The bicolored antvireo was described by the American ornithologist Frank Chapman in 1923 who considered it a subspecies of the white-shouldered antshrike (Thamnophilus aethiops) and coined the trinomial name Thamnophilus aethiops occidentalis.

There are two subspecies:
 D. o. occidentalis (Chapman, 1923) – southwest Colombia and north Ecuador
 D. o. punctitectus Chapman, 1924 – east Ecuador

References

External links
Xeno-canto: audio recordings of the bicolored antvireo
BirdLife Species Factsheet.

bicolored antvireo
Birds of the Colombian Andes
Birds of the Ecuadorian Andes
bicolored antvireo
Taxonomy articles created by Polbot